Amos Cardarelli (6 March 1930 – 1 July 2018) was an Italian professional footballer who played as a defender.

Honours

Player

Club
Roma
Serie B (1): 1951–52

International
 Represented Italy at the 1952 Summer Olympics.

Manager
ALMAS
Serie D (1): 1977–78

References

1930 births
2018 deaths
People from Monterotondo
Italian footballers
Serie A players
A.S. Roma players
Udinese Calcio players
Inter Milan players
Calcio Lecco 1912 players
Olympic footballers of Italy
Footballers at the 1952 Summer Olympics
Frosinone Calcio managers
Association football defenders
Italian football managers
Footballers from Lazio
Sportspeople from the Metropolitan City of Rome Capital